Greg Trine is an American author of children’s books and young adult fiction. He is the author of the Melvin Beederman Superhero series, Illustrated by Rhode Montijo and the young adult novel, The Second Base Club. His second series, The Adventures of Jo Schmo, illustrated by Frank Dormer, was a Junior Library Guild selection. The humorous science fiction novel, Willy Maykit in Space was nominated for the Sunshine State Young Readers Award. Since then, Greg has moved on to a graphic novel series, Dinomighty, written under the pen name Doug Paleo. Other stand-alone titles include Goldilocks Private Eye, George at the Speed of Light, Giant, Ruffing It, and Max Odor Does Not Stink.

Greg lives and works on the California coast. When he is not writing humorous books for kids, he can usually be found visiting schools and talking about the joys of reading and writing with children throughout the country.

Bibliography

Melvin Beederman Series
 The Curse of the Bologna Sandwich, Henry Holt and Co., 2006
 The Revenge of the McNasty Brothers, Henry Holt and Co., 2006
 The Grateful Fred, Henry Holt and Co., 2006	
 Terror in Tights, Henry Holt and Co., 2007
 The Fake Cape Caper, Henry Holt and Co., 2007	
 Attack of the Valley Girls, Henry Holt and Co., 2008
 The Brotherhood of the Traveling Underpants, Henry Holt and Co., 2009
 Invasion from Planet Dork, Henry Holt and Co., 2010

The Adventures of Jo Schmo
 Dinos Are Forever, Houghton Mifflin Harcourt, 2012
 Wyatt Burp Rides Again, Houghton Mifflin Harcourt, 2012
 Shifty Business, Houghton Mifflin Harcourt, 2013
 Pinkbeard's Revenge, Houghton Mifflin Harcourt, 2013

 The Second Base Club, Henry Holt and Co., 2010

 "Willy Maykit in Space", Houghton Mifflin Harcourt, 2016

 "Dinomighty", Houghton Mifflin Harcourt, 2020
 "Dinomighty, The Heist Age", Houghton Mifflin Harcourt 2021

References

External links

 Publisher's Author Page*

Living people
American children's writers
Year of birth missing (living people)